Hermosa is recognized as a populated place in Sierra County, New Mexico, United States. It is located in the Palomas Creek valley, west of Truth or Consequences.

It was founded in 1883 by miners and grew to a town that had its own literary society. In 1889, Hermosa was hit by a devastating flash flood and never recovered. All that remains today is a mercantile, a hotel, and a log post office. It is currently part of a privately owned ranch.

Hermosa was founded by J.C. Plemmons and was located in the center of the Palomas district. He established the first residence and mercantile along the southern fork of the Palomas Creek, where he positioned his cattle. He was most likely drawn to the area due to the presence of the Palomas mining camp, recognizing the possibility for a town.

References

Barbara H. Sherman. 1979. Ghost Towns and Mining Camps of New Mexico.
Kolleen M. Bean. 1996. Settlement States and Frontier Systems: The Historic American Settlement of New Mexico's Black Range Region.

External links
Ghost Towns: Hermosa

Ghost towns in New Mexico
Geography of Sierra County, New Mexico
History of Sierra County, New Mexico